Philippe de Gaspé Beaubien  (born 1928) is a Canadian media proprietor, who was chairman and CEO of Telemedia. He founded the company in 1968, and went on to acquire a number of radio stations in Quebec and Ontario, and launched magazines such as Canadian Living, Harrowsmith and the Canadian editions of ELLE and TV Guide. In 1990, together with his wife Nan-b de Gaspé Beaubien, he launched The Business Families Foundation (BFF), a non-profit charitable organization established in Canada to help business families in Canada and abroad.

He was educated at the Université de Montréal, obtaining a Bachelor of Arts in 1952, and at Harvard University, receiving his MBA in 1954. He was also a key organizer behind Expo 67.

Beaubien was chairman of the Canadian Association of Broadcasters in 1973 and 1974, and was the founder, president and honorary chairman of participACTION.

He was also presented with an honorary degree in law from York University in 1979, and was inducted into the Canadian Association of Broadcasters Hall of Fame in 1994.

In 1967, he was made an Officer of the Order of Canada "for his contribution to Centennial Year as director of operations for the 1967 World Exhibition".

In 1990, Philippe II de Gaspé Beaubien and his wife Nan-B created the Gaspé Beaubien Foundation to focus their philanthropic activities. The main themes of the Foundation's activities have been related to family business initiatives and clean water technologies.

References

1928 births
Living people
Canadian mass media owners
Officers of the Order of Canada
Place of birth missing (living people)
Université de Montréal alumni
Harvard Business School alumni
Expo 67
Canadian expatriates in the United States